Fun School is a series of educational packages developed and published in the United Kingdom by Europress Software, initially as Database Educational Software. The original Fun School titles were sold mostly by mail order via off-the-page adverts in the magazines owned by Database Publications. A decision was made to create a new set of programs, call the range Fun School 2, and package them more professionally so they could be sold in computer stores around the UK. Every game comes as a set of three versions, each version set to cater for a specific age range.

Fun School 1
Fun School 1 is the first set of educational games, created in 1984 by Database Educational Software for the Acorn Electron and BBC Micro computers. The three individual games catered for children aged under 6 years, between 6 and 8 years and over 8 years respectively. They also includes five children's Nursery Rhymes. The products were tested in classrooms and were educationally approved.

Fun School 2
Fun School 2 is the second set of educational games, created in 1989 by Database Educational Software. It was released on more computers than its predecessor including Acorn Electron, BBC Micro, ZX Spectrum, Commodore 64, Amstrad CPC, Atari ST, Amiga, MS-DOS and RISC OS. The three individual games catered for children aged under 6 years, between 6 and 8 years and over 8 years respectively.

The Fun School 2 games were programmed using the STOS (derived from BASIC) programming language with the STOS Compiler Engine.

Fun School 2 was reviewed as "The number one choice for our school" by Shelley Gibson. Fun School 2 was rated 3rd place in the "Gallup full-price software chart". Commodore Force rated Fun School 2 for Under 6 Years as #43, Fun School 2 Ages 6–8 as #36 and Fun School 2 Over 8 Years as number 10 in rankings of the top 100 Commodore 64 games of 1993. Despite its popularity among children, Fun School 2 was criticised by left-wing educationalists due to a competition element and the matter was brought to British MP Kenneth Baker.

Fun School 3

Fun School 3 is the third set of educational games, created in 1990 by Database Educational Software released for the ZX Spectrum, BBC Micro, Commodore 64, Amstrad CPC, Amstrad PCW, Atari ST, Amiga, Amiga CD32, MS-DOS and RISC OS computers. The three individual games catered for children aged under 5 years, between 5 and 7 years and over 7 years respectively. The games and their age ranges took in to full account of the new National Curriculum and the school syllabus content at the time.

The Fun School 3 games were developed using the STOS (derived from BASIC) programming language with the STOS Compiler Engine. For the Amiga version it was converted to AMOS using the AMOS Compiler by William Cochrane and Peter Hickman.

The Amiga version was hosted on the "Commodore 1990 Christmas" talk show along with AMOS 3D. The Amstrad PCW version won the European Computer Leisure Award as "Best Home Education Package" and also got the 8000 Plus Seal of Approval.

Fun School 4

Fun School 4 is the fourth set of educational games, created in 1992 by Europress Software (formerly called Database Educational Software) and released on the ZX Spectrum, Amstrad CPC, Commodore 64, Atari ST, Amiga, MS-DOS and RISC OS computers. The three individual games catered for children aged under 5 years, between 5 and 7 years and between 7 and 11 years respectively. The content of the games matched the educational material taught in schools of England and Wales in accordance with the National Curriculum. During the planning stages, an education competition was held by ST Format, in which the best entries were incorporated in the game.

The Amiga version of the Fun School 4 games were mostly created with the AMOS code using the AMOS Compiler engine.  TimeTable and Exchange Rates were written in asembler, this was primarily due to the complex nature of these two games and wanting to keep the performance up to an acceptable level.

Fun School Specials
Fun School Specials is a set of educational games, created in 1993 by Europress Software, consisting of four different games. Upon demand, Europress designed each game specifically with a certain major topic to add depth to spelling, maths, creativity and science, respectively and comply fully with the National Curriculum.

Paint and Create
Paint and Create was released on Commodore 64, Amiga and MS-DOS computers and has an easy interface divided into six activities aimed at younger audiences to do their own artwork.

Paint and Create got good review scores including 91% from Commodore Format and 94% from the CU Amiga magazine. It also got awarded the Screenstar from Amiga Reviews.

Spelling Fair
Spelling Fair was released on Commodore 64, Amiga and MS-DOS computers.

Merlin's Maths
Merlin's Maths was released on Amiga and MS-DOS computers. 
Merlin's Maths teaches mathematics on the topics of counting, decimals, fractions and volumes within six activities.

Young Scientist
'Young Scientist was created in 1995 and released on CD for Windows and Macintosh to teach science in depth. The game stars the main character Ozzie Otter and has up to forty scientific experiments to try out.

Fun School 5
Fun School 5 is the fifth set of educational games, released in 1995 by Europress Software on Windows. The games were originally planned to be released in 1993 with the age ranges 'Under 5s', '5s to 7s' and '7s to 11s'. However, there was a delay due to the development of the subject-specific Fun School Specials. The games were written using DOS 4GW and early versions had problems with some video drivers, forcing Europress to recall an entire stock before revising new versions. The three individual games catered for children aged between 4 and 7 years, between 6 and 9 years and between 8 and 11 years respectively and had their own specific themes with a goal to complete the game. The games introduced two children, Suki and Rik, and their pet purple dinosaur, Gloopy. The player has to assist Gloopy and the children in solving a number of challenges.

Fun School 6
Fun School 6 is the sixth set of educational games, created in 1996 by Europress Software released on Windows. The three individual games catered for children aged between 4 and 7 years, between 6 and 9 years and between 8 and 11 years respectively and had their own specific themes but each of the five topics remained in the same category with certain variations related to the age level. The games star Gloopy from Fun School 5, this time a pink dinosaur.

Fun School 7
Fun School 7 is the seventh and final set of educational games, created in 1998 by CBL Technology and released on Windows. The three individual games catered for children aged between 4 and 7 years, between 6 and 9 years and between 8 and 11 years respectively. The game makes use of 3D graphics.

Commercial performance
Before 1989, the educational market was dwindling and the release of "Fun School 2" was an outstanding success. The games sold over 60,000 copies by February and by this time a German Amiga package was developed. By April the games sold over 100,000 copies. During August in 1990, over 150,000 copies had been sold (including 30,000 Amstrad CPC copies). During the development of "Fun School 3" by December, 250,000 copies of the games had been sold.

Before the BBC Micro and PC versions were released "Fun School 3" had already sold 45,000 copies of other formats. By the time "Fun School 4" was in development, Europress had sold 300,000 copies of its Fun School products and 400,000 copies by April.

By 1992, over 500,000 copies of the Fun School Range products were sold. By 1993, over 650,000 Fun School packages had been sold. When Fun School 5 was released, over 800,000 Fun School Packages were sold and becoming an International Bestseller. During the release of "Fun School 6", around 1,500,000 copies of the Fun School Range were sold. When "Fun School 7" was released, 2 million copies of the Fun School Range were sold.

References

External links

History of Fun School, Fun School 2 and Fun School 3

Children's educational video games
Video game franchises
Video games developed in the United Kingdom
Video game franchises introduced in 1986
Acorn Archimedes games
Amiga games
Amstrad CPC games
Amstrad PCW games
Atari ST games
BBC Micro and Acorn Electron games
Amiga CD32 games
Commodore 64 games
DOS games
Windows games
ZX Spectrum games